A couscoussier is a traditional double-chambered food steamer used in Berber cuisine (particularly, the cuisines of Libya, Tunisia, Algeria and Morocco) to cook couscous.

It is typically made of two interlocking pots, made of either the traditional ceramic, or metal (steel, aluminium or copper). The first, which is the larger one, holds water or soup used to produce steam. The second, the smaller pot, is designed to be placed on top of the first, and has a lid and a perforated floor, so that it holds the couscous in place while allowing the steam to enter and seep through the grains. Once the couscous is steam-cooked, the lower pot may be used to simmer and complete its cooking, in order to serve the prepared dish.

See also
 List of cooking vessels

References

Cooking vessels
Boilers
Moroccan cuisine
Tunisian cuisine